Si-yeon, also spelled Shi-yeon, or Si-yun, Shi-yun, Si-yon, Shi-yon, is a Korean feminine given name. The meaning differs based on the hanja used to write each syllable of the name. There are 54 hanja with the reading "shi" and 56 hanja with the reading "yeon" on the South Korean government's official list of hanja which may be registered for use in given names.

People
People with this name include:

Sung Shi-yeon (born 1975), South Korean classical conductor
Park Si-yeon (born Park Mi-seon, 1979), South Korean actress
Lee Si-yeon (born Lee Dae-hak, 1980), South Korean transgender actress and model
Xiyeon (born Park Jung-hyun, 2000), South Korean singer, member of girl group Pristin

Fictional characters
Fictional characters with this name include:

Bang Shi-yeon, female character in 2012 South Korean television series SOS - Save Our School
Si-yeon, female character in 2015 South Korean film A Break Alone

See also
List of Korean given names

References

Korean feminine given names